Adam Motor Company, Ltd. is an automobile manufacturer and assembler based in Karachi, Pakistan. It produced Pakistan's first indigenous car Revo, and currently produce rehabilitation products like walking sticks, walkers, stretchers and hospital beds. It is wholly owned subsidiary of Omar Jibran Engineering Industries Ltd.

History 
Adam Motor Company Ltd. was notable for producing Pakistan's first indigenously designed car called Revo, whose production eventually got ceased in 2006 and assets were put up for sale.
Initially Adam Motor was involved in assembling light trucks from Chinese components, followed by a four-wheel drive utility vehicle.

Models
 Revo (subcompact car)
 Boltoro — 2x4 off-road vehicle
 Zabardast Econo
 Zabardast Super
 Zabardast

Rehabilitation Products 
GetOn... Motorized Wheelchair

 GetOn... Motorized Wheelchair (foldable)
 GetOn... Manual Wheelchairs
 GetOn... Walking Sticks & Crutches
 GetOn... Walkers
 GetOn... Patients Carrying Stretchers (foldable)
 GetOn... Hospital Beds Manual
 GetOn... Hospital Beds Motorized

See also
 Transport in Pakistan

References

External links
Adam Motor Company

Vehicle manufacturing companies established in 2001
Vehicle manufacturing companies disestablished in 2009
Defunct motor vehicle manufacturers of Pakistan
Manufacturing companies based in Karachi
Privately held companies of Pakistan